Oldambt is a municipality with a population of  in the province of Groningen in the Netherlands. It was established in 2010 by merging the municipalities of Reiderland, Scheemda, and Winschoten. It contains the city of Winschoten and these villages:

History 
The name "Oldambt" from "Ol dambt" meaning "the old fill" is derived from land reclamation efforts, starting after the catastrophic floodings of the 13th century. 

The municipality of Oldambt was established 1 January 2010, as a merger of the former municipalities of Reiderland, Scheemda and Winschoten.

Geography 

Near Bad Nieuweschans is the easternmost point of the Netherlands. The municipality falls within the region of Oldambt and the western part falls within the region of Rheiderland.

The municipality is bordered by the Dutch municipalities of Delfzijl (in the north), Slochteren (northwest), Menterwolde (west), Pekela (southwest), and Bellingwedde (south), and by the German municipalities of Bunde (east), Jemgum (northeast), and Emden (north).

The municipality contains the city of Winschoten, the villages of Bad Nieuweschans, Beerta, Blauwestad, Drieborg, Finsterwolde, Heiligerlee, Midwolda, Nieuw-Beerta, Nieuwolda, Nieuw-Scheemda, Oostwold, Scheemda, 't Waar, and Westerlee, and the hamlet Hongerige Wolf.

In the north of the municipality is part of the Dollart in the Wadden Sea, which is a UNESCO World Heritage Site since 2009. In the center is the Oldambtmeer, an artificial lake of more than 800 ha.

Demographics 
Oldambt is a developing municipality, in the heart of the region it is building a new housing area with more than 300 houses already: Blauwestad around the artificial lake Oldambtmeer of 800 hectares.

Government 
The government seat is in the city of Winschoten.

Transportation 
The highway A7 (E22) connects the municipality to the city of Groningen in the west and Leer (Germany) in the east. The Harlingen–Nieuweschans railway runs through the municipality with train stations in Scheemda, Winschoten, and Bad Nieuweschans. The trains are currently operated by Arriva and the busses by Qbuzz.

The train stops Heiligerlee and Ulsda were closed in 1934 and 1938.

Hospital
The municipality has the most modern hospital of the province of Groningen, the Ommelander Ziekenhuis Groningen in Scheemda.

Notable people 

 Wiebbe Hayes (born in Winschoten ca.1608) a colonial soldier and national hero re the Batavia
 Dirk Stikker (1897 in Winschoten – 1979) a Dutch politician, diplomat and Secretary General of NATO 1961/1964
 Bernard D. H. Tellegen (1900 in Winschoten – 1990) a Dutch electrical engineer and inventor of the pentode and the gyrator
 Herman Makkink (1937 in Winschoten – 2013) a Dutch sculptor, graphic artist and illustrator
 Bas Jan Ader (1942 in Winschoten – 1975) a Dutch conceptual and performance artist and photographer

 Jos Silvis (born 1953 in Winschoten) a judge at the European Court of Human Rights 2012/2016 and then attorney general at the Supreme Court of the Netherlands
 Marcel Hensema (born 1970 in Winschoten) a Dutch film actor

Sport 
 Levi Benima (1838 in Nieuweschans – 1922) a Dutch chess master
 Rynie Wolters (1842 in Nieuweschans – 1917) the first Dutch professional baseball player
 Jan de Bruine (1903 in Winschoten – 1983) a Dutch equestrian and silver medallist in show jumping at the 1936 Summer Olympics
 Arie Haan (born 1948 in Finsterwolde) a Dutch football manager and former player with 419 club caps 
 Jurrie Koolhof (1960 in Beerta – 2019) a Dutch international football striker with 417 club caps and manager. 
 Marnix Kolder (born 1981 in Winschoten) a Dutch professional footballer with over 500 club caps

Gallery

References

External links 

  

 
Municipalities of Groningen (province)
Municipalities of the Netherlands established in 2010